Clio cuspidata is a species of gastropods belonging to the family Cliidae.

The species has cosmopolitan distribution.

References

Pteropoda
Species